The Pipers River is a perennial river located in northern region of Tasmania, Australia. It was named for Captain Hugh Piper. The Aboriginal name for the river is Wattra karoola.

Course and features
The river rises below Mount Arthur near Lilydale. It runs through Hollybank Forest, a tourist attraction, before flowing through the outer reaches of Lilydale. It then proceeds through to Karoola, Lower Turners Marsh and then Pipers River town. The river has its mouth at Pipers Heads near the towns of Weymouth and Bellingham flowing into Noland Bay, Bass Strait. A number of tributaries flow into the Pipers River including; Pipers Brook, at Bellingham, Back Creek at Weymouth and Rocky Creek near Lilydale. The river descends  over its  course. The river isn't very tidal except in the immediate area around Weymouth.

Wildlife
Results from a genetic study indicated that specimens of Tasmanian giant freshwater crayfish from a site in the Pipers River catchment (Little Creek) were significantly genetically distinct from the rest of the species, and should be considered an important location for conservation.

See also

References

External links
 Resort in Pipers River

Rivers of Tasmania
Northern Tasmania